William E. Zamer is an American biologist at National Science Foundation and an Elected Fellow of the Association for the Advancement of Science.

References

Fellows of the American Association for the Advancement of Science
21st-century American biologists
Living people
Year of birth missing (living people)
Place of birth missing (living people)